The 2020 Bangabandhu Gold Cup or simply 2020 Bangabandhu Cup was an international football tournament organized and hosted by the Bangladesh Football Federation (BFF) as a name of tribute to Father of the Nation Bangabandhu Sheikh Mujibur Rahman. This was the 6th edition of the tournament, with six teams competing from 15 to 25 January 2020.

Palestine were the defending champions and successfully defended their title after beating Burundi 3–1 on 25 January 2020.

Participating nations
The FIFA Rankings of participating national teams before the draw, as of 19 December 2019.

Draw
The draw was held on 4 January 2020 at 12:00 BST at Pan Pacific Hotel Sonargaon in Dhaka. The 6 teams were drawn into 2 groups of 3, by selecting one team from each of the 3 ranked pots.

Venue
All matches were held at the Bangabandhu National Stadium, Dhaka, Bangladesh.

Match officials

Referees
 Mizanur Rahman
 Mohammed Jalal Uddin
 Virendha Rai
 Yaasin Hanafiah
 Sudish Pandey

Assistant Referees
 Manir Ahmmad Dali
 Mohammad Nuruzzaman
 Pema
 Hariff Akhir
 Rojen Shrestha

Group stage
Times listed are UTC+6:00 (BST)

Group A

Group B

Knockout stage
Times listed are UTC+6:00 (BST)
In the knockout stages, if a match finished goalless at the end of normal playing time, extra time would have been played (two periods of 15 minutes each) and followed, if necessary, by a penalty shoot-out to determine the winner.

Bracket

Semi-finals

Final

Goalscorers

Sponsorship
Local sports marketing company K–Sports bought the rights for this edition of the tournament and provided all the expenditures.

Prize money
The following prize money amounts were given at the end of the tournament.

Broadcasting rights

References

Bangabandhu Cup
2020 in Bangladeshi football
International association football competitions hosted by Bangladesh
Bangabandhu Cup